Austria and Hungary may refer to:

 Austria-Hungary, former European state from 1867 to 1918.
 Austria-Hungary relations